Keith Hale (born 6 November 1950) is an English songwriter, composer, record producer, performer and music teacher, most notable for his work with Toyah Willcox, Hawkwind and Ginger Baker.

Biography
The Yorkshire-born musician moved south when he was ten. Whilst in his final year at primary school he won first prize in the Cadbury's National Essay Competition for Schools. As a teenager he moved back to Hull to join Nothineverappens "Yorkshire's premier psychedelic band". Returning to London he collaborated in "Silly Balls", a mixed-media project designed to maximise audience participation but this proved too unwieldy to be commercially viable. His distinctive keyboard work and songwriting ability led him to being asked to join Comus in 1973. Later projects included his own band Blood Donor, Hawkwind, and Ginger Baker, before a long and successful association with Toyah. More recently, Hale writes and arranges school music productions, teaches keyboards and participates in songwriting workshops.

Career

Comus
Comus recorded an album for Virgin Records in 1974 entitled To Keep from Crying. Hale played keyboards and marimba.

Blood Donor
Determined to pursue his own musical vision, Hale formed Blood Donor in 1977. It had the then highly unusual line-up of two synthesizer players, two percussionists and a bass player. This group battled against a backdrop of punk rock, supported J.J. Burnel, and was signed to Arista Records in 1979. Various producers were used including Steve James and John Cale although they recorded the first album with Tonto's Expanding Head Band and Stevie Wonder producer Malcolm Cecil. Internal disputes between record company and management meant that this album was never released, although two singles were – Rubber Revolution and Rice Harvest. The latter, featuring a Vietnamese children's choir, is regularly revitalised for Hale's school productions.

Blood Donor can be seen performing Rice Harvest in the 1980 ATV documentary Toyah, at Toyah Willcox's Battersea warehouse where they frequently rehearsed.

In 2002, they reunited for a one-off 25th anniversary concert which took place at The Old Market in Hove, Sussex.

Hawkwind
In 1980, Hale joined Hawkwind, replacing Tim Blake who left during the Levitation tour. Together with drummer Ginger Baker, Hale left after a well documented band bust up at Rockfield Studios.

Ginger Baker
Following Hawkwind, Ginger then asked Hale to get a band together for which he enlisted the help of old friends Billy Jenkins and Ian Trimmer, as well as Blood Donor bassist Rikki Legair. Known as Ginger Baker's Nutters the band undertook two long European tours and recorded two live albums, Live in Milan 1980 and Ginger Baker in Concert. The band broke up when Ginger had to leave the UK for tax reasons.

Toyah
Hale co-wrote and co-produced Toyah's first album (and EP/AP) Sheep Farming in Barnet and her first single Victims of the Riddle. In February 1981 her version of Hale's song It's a Mystery reached no 4 in the UK Singles Chart. He then joined Toyah's band for more touring and TV work including Warrior Rock: Toyah On Tour, a double album recorded at the culmination of a 25-date UK tour, during two nights at the Hammersmith Odeon in July 1982. Toyah Willcox had this to say in 2011 – "So when it comes down to Warrior Rock, I know it's one of the best live albums ever made! And I’m confident about that and two fingers to everyone else about it really!".

Space Cadets
Hale, along with former Blood Donor colleagues John Bentley and Gordon Coxon released one experimental self-titled 'acid-jazz' album in 1988.

Jasper Fish
Nicknamed Jasper Fish by Ginger Baker (a reference to Hale originating from a fishing city), he recorded two albums in the guise of Jasper Fish and the Alice Band. Alice is the name of Hale's daughter. Supported Jools Holland in 1998. Described as 'very much in the Canterbury style of the '70s'.

Mind Your Head
Project with Squeeze bass player and former Space Cadet John Bentley. Performed showcase at Ropetackle, Shoreham, 2 May 2008.

Musical director and music tutor
In the present day, Hale writes and arranges many children's musical productions in the Kent and London area and teaches keyboards and songwriting at Charles Darwin School. He has participated with members of Squeeze's Chris Difford's songwriting workshops in Italy.

Discography (selected)

Singles and EPs
 Blood Donor | "Rubber Revolution" / "Chemical Babies" (Arista ARIRV 262 1979)
 Blood Donor | "Rice Harvest" / "Something Happened" (Arista ARIST 279 1979)
 Blood Donor | "Doctor?" / "Soap Box Blues" (Safari SAFE 29 1980)
 Toyah | "Victims of the Riddle" (Safari SAFE 15 1979)
 Toyah | "Sheep Farming in Barnet" (Safari SAP 1 1979)
 Toyah | "Four from Toyah" (Safari TOY1 1981) No. 4 UK

Studio albums
 Comus | To Keep from Crying (Virgin 1974)
 Blood Donor | The Chappell Tapes (Realvision)
 Hawkwind | Levitation (Atomhenge 1980)
 Hawkwind | Zones (Flickknife 1983)
 Space Cadets | Space Cadets (Space Cadet SPACAD 1 1989)
 Toyah | Sheep Farming in Barnet (Safari 1C064 1980)
 Toyah | Anthem (Safari VOOR 1 1981) No. 2 UK
 Toyah | Mayhem (Safari VOOR 77 1985)
 Jasper Fish | Around the Room in Eighty Days (GEMS 1998)
 Jasper Fish | Night of the Long Knives (GEMS 1999)
 Alice Hale | In the Real World
 Ian M Hale | Successor

Live albums
 Ginger Baker | Nutters Live in Milan 1980 (Voiceprint 1981)
 Toyah | Warrior Rock: Toyah On Tour (Safari TNT 201 1982)
 Ginger Baker | In Concert (Onsala ONS2 1987)

Compilation albums
 Toyah | Toyah! Toyah! Toyah! (K-Tel NE 1268 1984)
 Hawkwind | Epocheclipse (Castle 1999)
 Hawkwind | The Stonehenge Collection (Flickknife 2000)

References

1950 births
Living people
English composers
English songwriters
English record producers
Musicians from Kingston upon Hull
Hawkwind members
Toyah (band) members